The Karamea Bight is the name given to a large bay in the Tasman Sea formed by a curved stretch of the West Coast of New Zealand's South Island. It stretches for 100 kilometres north from Cape Foulwind to just north of the mouth of the Heaphy River.

References 

Buller District
Bays of New Zealand
Landforms of the West Coast, New Zealand
Karamea